International Taekwon-Do Federation (ITF) is an international taekwondo organization founded on March 22, 1966, by General Choi Hong Hi (Korean: 최홍희) in Seoul, South Korea. The ITF was founded to promote and encourage the growth of the Korean martial art of Taekwon-Do.

The ITF's main functions include coordinating and approving tournaments and seminars, setting standards for teaching (patterns, sparring, destruction), collaborating with affiliated member organizations, and providing services members in regard to rank and certifications.

After General Choi´s death (2002), there was a great controversy around the election of the successor of the founder of the discipline that ended up leading the ITF to suffer different splits. Currently, four splits have been known worldwide in relation to the official ITF chaired by Prof. Ri Yong Son, based in Vienna, Austria. The best-known divisions worldwide are the ITF Administration, chaired by Choi Jung Hwa, (son of General Choi), the ITF Organization, created by Grand Master Tran Trieu Quan and currently chaired by GM Paul Weiler
On the other hand, a last known split was the Unified ITF, founded in 2004 by Grandmaster Hwang Kwang Sung.

Patterns 

Patterns, or tul (틀) in Korean, originally called hyeong (형), form an important aspect of training in Taekwon-Do. They are equivalent to the kata in karate. The majority of the patterns (except Yul-Gok, Ul-Ji and Tong-Il) start with a defensive move, which emphasizes Taekwon-Do's defensive nature.  All of the patterns start and end at the same location. This ensures that the practitioners' stances are the correct length, width, and in the proper direction. Additionally, students are taught to understand the purpose of each movement and recognize how each motion connects to theories of power.

There are 24 patterns in the official ITF syllabus; this is symbolic of the 24 hours in a day. One additional pattern, Ko-Dang (or Go-Dang), was retired/replaced by Juche in 1986 by General Choi Hong Hi. The names of these patterns typically refer either to events in Korean history or to important people in Korean history.  Elements of the patterns may also be historical references, such as the number of moves, the diagram, the way the pattern ends, and so on.

Patterns (tul) are performed in accordance with "The Encyclopedia of Taekwon-Do" in 15 volumes written by General Choi Hong Hi, the latest edition being from 1999 (later editions have been published, but the 1999 editions were the last General Choi Hong Hi was directly involved with). This comprehensive work contains 15 volumes with volumes 8 to 15 dedicated to the 24 patterns and containing descriptions of the pattern movements as well as pictures showing possible applications of some of the movements.  There is also the book entitled "The Korean Art of Self Defense" (the 1999 edition,  the latest used by ITF under Chang Ung), also known as the Condensed Encyclopedia, written by General Choi Hong Hi. This is a single condensed encyclopedia of approximately 770 pages with a section dedicated to the 24 original patterns.

There are also three fundamental exercises, named Saju Jirugi (Four Direction Punch), Saju Makgi (Four Direction Block) and Saju Tulgi (Four Direction Thrust). Saju Jirugi and Saju Makgi are basic defence exercises taught to beginners of the martial art. Saju Tulgi is less well known and is generally taught to 2nd Kup students just prior to Hwa-Rang. Saju Tulgi is not presented in the Condensed Encyclopedia but is present in the 15 Volume Encyclopedia (see: Volume 10, page 122).

The 24 Patterns in Taekwon-Do ITF are:

The retired pattern in Taekwon-Do ITF is

Kodang (고당) (39 Movements)
Woo-Nam (우남) (42 Movements)

Sparring 

The International Taekwon-Do Federation's sparring rules are similar to the WT's rules, but differ in several aspects.
 Hand attacks to the head are allowed.
 The scoring system (by ITF chaired by Prof. Ri Yong Son, based in Vienna) is:
 1 point for punch to the head and body
 2 point for kick to the body
 3 point for kick to the head

 point for: Punch to the body or head
 2 points for: Kick to the body
 3 points for: Kick to the head

 points for: Mid-air kick (180°) directed to high section, Mid-air kick (360° or more) to mid-section
 5 points for: Mid-air kick (360° or more) to high section
 The competition area is typically a 10×10 meter square in international championships. Circular rings are also used, although generally not under competitive circumstances.
Competitors do not wear the hogu (although they are required to wear approved foot and hand protection equipment, as well as head guards). This scoring system varies between the different ITF organisations.

A continuous point system is utilized in ITF competition, where the fighters are allowed to continue after scoring a technique. Full-force blows are not allowed, and knockouts result in a disqualification of the attacker; although these rules vary between ITF organizations. At the end of two minutes (or some other specified time) the competitor with more scoring techniques wins.

Fouls in ITF sparring include heavy contact, attacking a fallen opponent, leg sweeping, holding/grabbing, intentional attack to a target other than allowed (for example below the belt, attacks to the back).

ITF competitions also feature performances of patterns, breaking, and 'special techniques' (where competitors perform prescribed board breaks at great heights).

ITF competition sparring rounds are 2 minutes, and, in national and international levels of competition, they hold two rounds each 2 minutes with a one-minute rest in between. Certain rules are no strikes below the belt, no elbow strikes, brawling, no falling down, no going outside of the ring, hit to the groin and knee strike are not allowed. The ring is a 9 metre by 9 metre (8 × 8 metre optional) ring marked by square mats or tape instead of a traditional style kickboxing rings with ropes. It has no sides allowing the fighter to move out of bounds. Whenever a fighter creates an infraction of the rules the centre referee will issue a warning to the fighter who created the infraction. 3 warnings equals a minus point. If a fighter uses excessive contact, he or she will be given a foul, which is an automatic minus point; three fouls in a bout results in disqualification. ITF taekwon-do is fought in continuous point sparring. Four judges score the fights in each of the corners in the square ring. After the fight, a judge votes for which ever fighter has the most points and a winner is declared. In the case of a draw the fighters go to a one-minute overtime round. If there is another draw the fighters go to a sudden death round where the fighter who scores first is declared the winner.

The official rules for ITF sparring competition are available at the ITF website.

Ranks
The ITF ranking system consists of six solid colour belts; white, yellow, green, blue, red, and black.

Coloured belt ranks are called in English grades and in Korean geup (급) (often romanized as gup or kup), whereas black belt ranks are called ranks/dan (단):

The reason for nine black belt degrees is that the number nine is not only the highest of the single-digit numbers, but also is the number of three multiplied by three. In the Orient, three is one of the more esteemed numbers. The Chinese character for 3 is three horizontal lines, one above the other: 三. The bottom line represents earth; the middle line represents mortals; the upper line represents heaven. It was believed that a man who could unite the three realms in himself, would aspire or be reborn into a king; this is shown by the vertical line connecting the realms in the character for king: 王.

Black belt promotion
Up to 8th dan, all ranks require the student to perform a test of all skills and knowledge up to their rank to be promoted.  9th dan may be awarded with consent of the promotion committee with no physical test required, due to the nature and responsibilities of a master no longer being centered on the physical development. However, if the recipient desires, a demonstration may be performed. 9th degree (being the highest) can only be awarded when the special committee examines and reaches a unanimous consent.

According to an ITF Encyclopedia 4th degree may grade students up to 2nd degree. 
A 5th or 6th degree International Instructor may grade students up to 3rd degree, while a 7th degree Master may grade students up to 5th degree. An 8th degree Master may grade students up to 6th degree. Promotion to 7th degree or above must be done by the ITF's Master Promotion Committee.

Philosophy 
The philosophy of taekwon-do is summarized in the oath and the tenets.

Taekwon-Do Student Oath

I shall observe the tenets of Taekwon-Do.

I shall respect the instructor and seniors.

A student vows to respect their instructors and those senior to them (both in age and rank). An instructor must also act respectfully to all students and persons in order to be respected and therefore not misusing Taekwon-Do.

I shall never misuse Taekwon-Do.

One will never misuse Taekwon-Do to harm another, for their own personal gain or for any other manner that is unjust (this one is particularly important in any martial art, not just Taekwon-Do, as a trained martial artist could easily kill a person in unarmed close combat).

I shall be a champion of freedom and justice.

The 4th line, “I shall be a champion of freedom and justice” can apply to many areas of life and although many may think one would have to do something amazing to achieve this, this part of the oath can be respected by even the littlest things in ones daily activity. If one becomes more open-minded to understanding others ideologies or the way others go about their lives instead of being quick to judge, then maybe the world would be a more understanding and accepting place. Thus allowing people to have the freedom they deserve. By accepting this belief one is bringing justice to this world and therefore being a champion of justice. As we often see, conflicts can occur  over common misconceptions of information. One must understand the full story and have all the facts before he can truly make a proper judgement.

I shall build a more peaceful world.

The final line of the oath is “I shall build a more peaceful world”. One can also easily obtain this goal by going about their daily lives in a more peaceful manner. If everyone did this, the world would obviously become a more peaceful place. As we often see, conflicts can occur over common misconceptions of information. One must understand the full story and have all the facts before he can truly make a proper judgement. However, this does not mean a student cannot defend themselves against aggression directed towards themselves as that would defeat some of the purpose of Taekwondo, an art of unarmed self-defence.

Taekwon-Do Tenets

There are five tenets defined in the ITF.

 Courtesy (Ye-ui / 예의, 禮儀)
 Showing courtesy to all, respecting others, having manners as well as maintaining the appropriate etiquette at all times, both within and outside the dojang (도장) (designated training area).

 Integrity (Yeom-chi / 염치, 廉恥)
 Although it may be similar, this form of integrity takes on a wider role than defined in the common dictionary. In Taekwondo, integrity means not only to determine what is right or wrong but also having the conscience to feel guilt if one has done wrong and to have the integrity stand up for what is right.

 Perseverance (In-nae / 인내, 忍耐)
 One will persevere time and time again until they have achieved a result which is adequate towards what one was trying to achieve.

 Self-control (Geuk-gi / 극기, 克己)
 This means to not only have control over one's physical acts, but also their mental thoughts and actions.

 Indomitable spirit (Baek-jeol-bul-gul / 백절불굴, 百折不屈)
 To have indomitable spirit means to have the courage to stand up for what you believe in, no matter what odds you are up against, and to always give 100% effort in whatever you do.

History and Schism
After the South Korean Government abandoned the ITF, the government established the World Taekwondo Federation to continue the mission of taekwondo's globalization. Once General Choi Hong Hi (최홍희) was exiled out of South Korea, he established the new headquarters of the ITF in Vienna, Austria and the organization settled there. In the years that followed, many of the founding masters of the ITF and several other instructors would leave the organization to form their own independent organizations, following political differences with Choi Hong Hi. 

In 2001, the ITF Congress voted for Choi Hong Hi as president for four years of the six-year term, then for his son Choi Jung Hwa to serve as president for the remaining two years. This was overturned (whether legally or illegally is disputed) by General Choi, causing a rift between himself and his son. Choi Jung Hwa split away from his father and created another organization, which Choi Jung Hwa claimed to be the true ITF. While the majority of the ITF at the time stayed with General Choi, many others decided to follow Choi Jung Hwa. General Choi subsequently died in June 2002, having never reconciled with his son. On his deathbed in June 2002, General Choi said that he wanted Chang Ung, a North Korean IOC member, to take over as president. An Extraordinary Congress of the ITF was called with Chang Ung declared as the new president.

As of 2021 there are two main organization claiming the ITF mantle. One headed by Master RI Yong Son, with offices in Pyongyang, North Korea. The other under the conduction of an international board of Grand Masters and presided by Grand Master Paul Weiler with offices around the globe.

See also
Ki Ha Rhee
 Tran Trieu Quan

References

Taekwondo organizations
Sports organizations established in 1966
Organizations based in Seoul
1966 establishments in South Korea